"Try It Out" is a 1981 single by the Montreal-based singer, Gino Soccio.  From the album, Closer, "Try It Out" along with the track, "Hold Tight" hit number one on the dance chart for six weeks and was the top hit on the dance play chart for the year.  "Try It Out" also reached number twenty-two on the soul singles chart.

Chart positions

See also
List of number-one dance singles of 1981 (U.S.)

References

1981 singles
1981 songs
Song articles with missing songwriters